The 2013–14 Egyptian Premier League was the fifty-seventh season of the Egyptian Premier League since its establishment in 1948. It started on December 26, 2013 and ended on July 7, 2014

Clubs
A total of 65 clubs have played in the Egyptian Premier League from its inception in 1948–49 up to and including the 2013–14 season. But only two clubs have been members of the Egyptian Premier League for every season since its inception. They are Al Ahly and Zamalek.

The league consists of 2 groups each of 11 clubs. Al Ahly tops the first group, and Zamalek tops the second. The first two teams of each group will advance to the competition playoff, while the ninth team of each group will advance to the relegation play-off. The last two teams of each group will be relegated directly to the Egyptian Second Division.

The following 22 clubs are competing in the Egyptian Premier League during the 2013–14 season.

League table

Group 1

Group 2

Final stage

Championship play-off

Relegation play-off

Telephonat Beni Suef relegated to the Second Division.

1
1
Egypt